The Sheung Shui Mosque and Islamic Centre is a proposed mosque and Islamic centre currently under construction in Fanling–Sheung Shui New Town, North District, New Territories, Hong Kong. It will be the 6th mosque built in Hong Kong and the first one in New Territories. Upon completion, the mosque will serve the increasing population of Muslims living in New Territories, which numbers well over 50,000. It will be operated by United Muslims Association of Hong Kong.

History
The co-founder and second chairman of UMAH, the late Mr. Alli Din, originally offered his own piece of land, his home, to the Islamic Board of Trustees (BOT) to be made into a Masjid in 1979, which was rejected by the Hong Kong Government at the time. Mr. Din applied again from the platform of UMAH in November 1990.

UMAH also intended to establish a non-profit secondary international school for ethnic minority children resident in Hong Kong, but the Hong Kong Government has not yet granted approval for such a project to proceed. At present, this remains a gap in the resources and facilities available to the Muslim community in Hong Kong.

In 2000, UMAH received an offer for the piece of land in Sheung Shui at FSST Lot no. 203 in D.D. 51 and D.D. 52, Fung Nam Road, Sheung Shui, N.T., Hong Kong (the “Land”) . Following 6 years of continuous public consultations led by the government, UMAH's ownership of the Land was confirmed on 31 March 2006 under a private treaty grant as New Grant No. 20193.

The land premium was set at (HK$9,350,000.00) by the Hong Kong Government in 2005. Based on research conducted by UMAH, the land premium was a hyper-inflated amount, as most other similar projects received land grants at a nominal rate of HK$1000. This cost was ultimately borne through donations by Muslims in Hong Kong and overseas, and the amount paid to the Hong Kong Government February 24, 2006 increased with half a million-interest due to the delay in coming up with the premium.  (Final amount of HK9,941,509.00).

Following Mr. Din's passing at the end of 2009, UMAH was forced to undergo a re-examination of the organization's role and leadership between 2010 and 2019 (the “Restructuring Period”). During the reconstruction period, the Incorporated Trustees of Islamic Fund of HK was entrusted to take care of the mosque project, in liaison with the major sponsor and the Hong Kong government.

The prevailing leadership of UMAH was declared by the Hong Kong courts in 2019. All government departments were continuously kept updated and extensions to the lease agreement were requested and granted by these departments during the Restructuring Period. UMAH led the establishment of the Sheung Shui Mosque and Elderly Care Centre Action Committee, composed of representatives from various Muslim organizations in Hong Kong, in 2017. This committee was given the mandate to make all decisions related to the construction of the Sheng Shui Masjid project.

Project support by the Ministry of Finance for Kingdom of Saudi Arabia 
1.     The Kingdom of Saudi Arabia (KSA) entered into a Memorandum of Agreement with UMAH and pledged funds for the construction of the following projects in 2009 related to the Sheng Shui Masjid as stated in the Private Treaty Grant (PTG) held by UMAH which includes the following:

1.     Elderly Care Centre

 1.     Masjid (Mosque)
 1.     Imam Quarters (Scholar's Quarters)
 1.     Carpark
 1.     Canteen
 1.     Travelers’ Quarters

The KSA Ministry of Finance (MOF) (the “Sponsor”) released 2 overseas tender requests from 2010 to 2016, but due to high estimates from contractors they were rejected by the Sponsor. In October 2018, the KSA Consulate in Hong Kong confirmed re-commencement of the Sheng Shui Masjid project with a revised budget approval of US$39.4 million and instructed UMAH and the Authorized Person (AP) of the Sheng Shui Masjid project to proceed with a local tendering exercise which was successful in receiving bids within the allocated budget. Subsequently, however, the Sponsor decided it would re-tender the Sheng Shui Masjid project, and the invitation to tender was issued in December 2019 following meetings between UMAH and the Sponsor in the KSA in mid-2019. The Sponsor's latest tender process is expected to conclude by end of September 2020 and the main construction to commence by December 2020.

Dealings with the Lands Department 
Rent payments over the Land are current until the end of September 2020. A condition of grant over the Land was to commence the Sheng Shui Masjid project by 31 March 2011, which, due to the delays ensuing as a result of the Restructuring Period, was extended to 31 December 2019 (the “Grant Condition”).  The Lands Department issued a reminder notice to UMAH to start site formation works before December 2019 in order not to breach the Grant Condition. What should have been adequate time to complete the Sheng Shui Masjid has not seen the project proceed in a linear manner despite UMAH's best efforts and ongoing and proactive steps to keep the project momentum going.

Due to delays in the Sponsor-led tendering process to complete main construction works which were only issued in December 2019, UMAH commenced site formation works (including hoarding works as the first step of site formation works) in parallel with the ongoing Sponsor tender process.

Despite the difficulties posed by social unrest in Hong Kong throughout 2019 and the lockdown of Hong Kong due to COVID-19 pandemic throughout 2020, UMAH received Buildings Department approval in June 2020 to begin hoarding works and immediately commenced construction works in August 2020. The funds for the hoarding works were raised by UMAH concurrently from generous support of the Hong Kong Muslim community. In addition, the Sponsor issued US$100,000 to support the commencement of hoarding works.

Current status of the Sheung Shui Mosque 
On 2 September 2020, the Lands Department visited the project site and ordered immediate cessation of hoarding works. All construction workers were asked to leave the site immediately. The Lands Department concurrently issued a Lands Department Memorial of Re-entry dated 2 September 2020 (the “Memorial”) on behalf of the Hong Kong government stating that the Land private treaty grant had been cancelled (i.e. the land has been declared “unleased land”) under Cap. 126(4).

Cap. 126 Government Rights (Re-entry and Vesting Remedies) Ordinance is a Hong Kong law relating to government rights of re-entry under a Government lease, and the Lands Department has enforced this right by issuing the Memorial. Unfortunately, UMAH's efforts of staying current on rent payments (at present until end of September 2020) on the Land does not waive the Government's rights of re-entry (Cap. 126(6)).

UMAH’s option under Hong Kong is to appeal the Memorial, which only provides two options 

 RELIEF OPTION 1 - Petition the Chief Executive to grant relief against re-entry, which must be made within 6 months from the Memorial being issued unless the Chief Executive themselves grants an extension. If the former owner elects this option, they are barred from making an application under Relief Option 2.
 RELIEF OPTION 2 - Apply to the Court of First Instance for equitable relief against the re-entry. This is only an option if the former owner has not already pursued Relief Option 1.

This is an undue burden for a charity organisation such as UMAH which is familiar with protracted legal experience and has limited funds (especially for purposes not directly benefiting the charity's intended beneficiaries.

Of the two Relief Options above, the most pragmatic avenue is for UMAH to petition for the Chief Executive to use her authority to dismiss the Memorial and allow continuation of the construction works to resume.

UMAH has written to the Lands Department seeking the immediate cancellation (in whole) of the Memorial pursuant to subsection (1) of Cap. 126(11). UMAH is asserting that the Memorial was unduly served, especially as the project commenced in December 2019 and due to the following reasons, which the Lands Department is aware of:

● 2010-2019: Restructuring Period of UMAH;
● 2019: Hong Kong protests and social unrest (including locally in the New Territories); and 
● 2020: Lockdown of Hong Kong due to COVID-19 pandemic.

 We hope that the Chief Executive considers the challenges faced by this project, especially in the latter stages where smooth work was halted due to the social unrest and pandemic. We request her to use her authority for the benefit of minority and elderly communities of Hong Kong.
 UMAH may consider additional partners under bilateral legal agreements to support the Sheng Shui Masjid project who have a strong understanding of the Hong Kong Muslim community. 
 Additionally, UMAH is seeking to align itself with construction professionals who have relevant experience on projects (especially Masjids) in Hong Kong and abroad to ensure the Sheng Shui Masjid project can be completed on time and to budget.

Significance of the Sheung Shui Mosque project 

 The Elderly Care Home will serve the growing needs of the elderly Muslim population in Hong Kong.
 This is the first new Masjid to be built in Hong Kong in well over 80 years and the first since the handover in 1997 and provides much needed community support for ethnic minorities to ensure they feel integrated into and part of Hong Kong.
 This Land was fought for by UMAH because of the need to construct resources and facilities that cater to the Muslim population's religious, worship, educational and social service needs.
 At a time where raising minority voices is gaining global attention, the Sheng Shui Masjid is an opportunity for the Hong Kong Government to demonstrate its foresight of such issues. 
 This project has global support including from the Sponsor and many prominent individuals, organisations, and the Equal Opportunities Commission - because they recognise its importance to Hong Kong. To date, more than 25 support letters from leading community organisations / institutions have pledge support for the Sheng Shui Masjid(mosque) project.

Architecture
The area of the plot of land involved for the construction is 2,046 m2. The overall building comprises six stories, where two of them will be allocated for Sheung Shui Mosque and the rest are for a 200-bed elderly care home. It is meant to be a state-of-the art facility catering to the needs of elderly while applying healthy-ageing concept with innovative technologies and methodologies, as well collaborating with leading local research institutions.

Transportation
The mosque will be served North from Sheung Shui station of the MTR. It is a 10 minutes walk from the nearest MTR Exit.

See also
 Islam in Hong Kong
 List of mosques in Hong Kong

References

External links
 

Buildings and structures under construction in Hong Kong
Mosques in Hong Kong
North District, Hong Kong
Proposed mosques